Billy Dean is an American country music artist. His discography comprises eleven studio albums, five compilation albums, 28 singles, and three guest singles. His first three studio albums — Young Man, Billy Dean and Fire in the Dark — are all certified gold by the RIAA, as is his 1994 Greatest Hits album.

Dean's highest-charting solo singles in the U.S. all peaked at number 3 on the Billboard Hot Country Songs charts: "Only Here for a Little While", "Somewhere in My Broken Heart", and "If There Hadn't Been You". The latter and its follow-up, "Tryin' to Hide a Fire in the Dark", both reached number 1 on the RPM Country Tracks charts in Canada. Dean and Alison Krauss both received chart credit for their guest vocals on Kenny Rogers' 2000 Number One hit "Buy Me a Rose".

Studio albums

1990s albums

2000s albums

2010s albums

2020s albums

Compilation albums

Singles

1990s

2000s and 2010s

Other singles

Other charted songs

Christmas releases

Guest singles

Videography

Music videos

Notes

A^ Song featured Faith Hill, Bryan White, Garth Brooks, Michael McDonald, Neal McCoy, Victoria Shaw and Olivia Newton-John.

References

Country music discographies
Discographies of American artists